The 2022 Campeonato Cearense (officially the Cearense 1XBET 2022 for sponsorship reasons) was the 108th edition of Ceará's top professional football league organized by FCF. The competition began on 8 January and ended on 23 April 2022.

After Sportradar found evidence of match fixing, on 16 February 2022, the FCF and the Tribunal de Justiça Desportiva do Futebol do Ceará (TJDF-CE) decided to suspend Crato from the tournament. Therefore, the last match of the first stage Crato v Ferroviário, scheduled for 19 February 2022, was not played and Ferroviário was awarded a 3–0 win.

On 22 February 2022, Icasa were denounced by Atlético Cearense before the TJDF-CE for fielding Leandro Mendes in the match Iguatu v Icasa played on 19 February 2022 (14th round). He was booked three times during the tournament (against Crato, Ferroviário and Maracanã) and was ineligible for the match against Iguatu. Later, Maracanã and Icasa asked the TJDF-CE to expel Crato from the tournament instead of suspending them. With this request, all the matches played by Crato would be annulled and replaced by 3–0 wins, which would allow Maracaná to qualify for the quarter-finals and avoid the possible relegation of Icasa. As the first legs of the semifinals were scheduled for 6 and 8 March 2022, the TJDF-CE suspended the Campeonato Cearense from 6 to 11 March 2022 until the judgement of the case. Although the announcement of the suspension was made while Caucaia and Iguatu were playing the first leg of their semi-final, the match was finished. On 7 March 2022, the STJD (Superior Tribunal de Justiça Desportiva) authorized the FCF to continue with the tournament as initially scheduled. Days later, the TJDF-CE also authorized the normal development of the tournament until the end of the match fixing investigation. On 25 April 2022, the TJDF-CE excluded Crato from the tournament and the matches played by Crato against Pacajus, Iguatu, Atlético Cearense and Ferroviário were annulled and replaced by 3–0 wins, however, two weeks later the TJDF-CE overturned its own decision and annulled all the matches played by Crato and replaced them by 3–0 wins. On 19 May 2022, the STJD, in response to a request from the FCF, Fortaleza, Ferroviário, Caucaia, Iguatu and Crato, temporarily suspended the decisions of the TJDF-CE. Finally, on 23 June 2022, the STJD overruled the decisions of the TJDF-CE confirming the match results and the title of Fortaleza.

Finally, Icasa were deducted four points and sanctioned with a fine of R$3,000 after they were punished, on 25 August 2022, by the TJDF-CE for fielding Leandro Mendes. Icasa were relegated.

The finals were played between the defending champions Fortaleza and Caucaia. Fortaleza won 4–0 on aggregate to win their 45th title.

Format
In the first stage the teams (except the teams that participated in the 2022 Copa do Nordeste, Ceará and Fortaleza) played the other teams on a home-and-away round-robin tournament. Top two teams advanced to the semi-finals, while third and fourth places advanced to the quarter-finals. The bottom two teams were relegated to 2023 Campeonato Cearense Série B. First stage winners qualified for the 2023 Copa do Brasil. Ceará and Fortaleza started their participation in the quarter-finals.

Quarter-finals, semi-finals and finals were played on a home-and-away two-legged basis. If tied on aggregate, the penalty shoot-out would be used to determine the winners. A draw was held to determine the home-and-away teams for the quarter-finals and the semi-finals, while for the finals, the team with best performance in the semi-finals hosted the second leg. Champions qualified for the 2023 Copa do Brasil.

Teams

First stage

Final stages

Bracket

Quarter-finals

|}

Group 1

Group 2

Semi-finals

|}

Group 3

Group 4

Finals
As Caucaia and Fortaleza had already qualified for the Copa do Brasil by winning the first stage and the 2022 Copa do Nordeste, respectively, third place Ferroviário earned a berth for the 2023 Copa do Brasil.

|}

Matches

Overall table

Top goalscorers

References

Cearense
2022 in Brazilian football